was a pioneering Japanese cinematographer.

Career 
Born in Tokyo, Ohara joined Shochiku's Kamata Studio in 1924 and was promoted to cinematographer in 1927. He is most known for his work with Heinosuke Gosho, including The Dancing Girl of Izu (1933), and for the soft tone of his images. He helped establish the modern touch of Shochiku's cinematography at Kamata along with Bunjirō Mizutani and Mitsuo Miura. He later worked at Tokyo Hassei Eiga, Toho, Shintoho, and Daiei Film. He shot films for many of Japan's great directors such as Akira Kurosawa, Yasujirō Ozu, Kenji Mizoguchi, Kōzaburō Yoshimura, Yutaka Abe, Masahiro Makino, Shohei Imamura, Shūe Matsubayashi, and Koji Shima. In 1954, he won the award for best cinematography at the Mainichi Film Awards for his work on Ai to shi no tanima and Niwatori wa futatabi naku.

Selected filmography 

The Dancing Girl of Izu (1933)
Somniloquy of the Bridegroom (Hanamuko no negoto) (1935)
A Burden of Life (Jinsei no onimotsu) (1935)
Lady of the Night with a Hazy Moon (Oboroyo no onna) (1936)
The New Road (Part one) (Shindō zenhen) (1936)
The New Road (Part two) (Shindō kōhen) (1936)
Ahen senso (1943)
The Most Beautiful (1944)
The Munekata Sisters (1950)
Portrait of Madame Yuki (1950)
Inn at Osaka (Osaka no yado) (1954)
Non-chan Kumo ni Noru (1955)
Takekurabe (1955)
Endless Desire (1958)

References

External links 

Japanese cinematographers
1902 births
People from Tokyo
1990 deaths